Paramorpha eburneola is a moth in the Carposinidae family. It is found in Australia, where it has been recorded from Tasmania.

References

Natural History Museum Lepidoptera generic names catalog

Carposinidae
Moths described in 1927